Winfried Michel (born 1948 in Fulda) is a German recorder player, composer, and editor of music.

Michel studied with Ingetraud Drescher, Nikolaus Delius, and Frans Brüggen. He is lecturer for the recorder at the Staatliche Hochschule Münster and at the Musikakademie Kassel. In addition to compositions published under his own name, he has written numerous pieces in the style of the early 18th century under the pseudonym Giovanni Paolo Simonetti. In 1993 he succeeded in convincing noted Haydn scholar H. C. Robbins Landon and the pianist/scholars Paul and Eva Badura-Skoda that six piano sonatas he had composed were long-lost works by Joseph Haydn.

Based on the opening few bars of six lost Haydn works, found in an old thematic index, these sonatas were published in 1995 as works by Haydn, "supplemented and edited by Winfried Michel." He has similarly completed the Viola Sonata left as a two-movement fragment by Mikhail Glinka with a menuet as third movement, even though Glinka would have—according to his autobiography—put a rondo.

Compositions

As Winfried Michel
Aceto e vino, for harpsichord (1991)
, for two violins (archive from 9 October 2007, accessed 14 September 2014)
Il flauto da gamba, for recorder and piano
Gedämfte Schwingung, for solo alto recorder (1988/93)
Glissgliss, op. 16, for recorder and piano
Spielwelt und Weltspiel, op. 49, song cycle
Taglied mit dem Schatten, for voice and piano
Trombetta sordina, for recorder and metronome
Tu-i, op. 4, for alto recorder and harpsichord (1990)
Der Vogel hinter der Welt, op. 42, pantomime

As Giovanni Paolo Simonetti
Six Trio Sonatas, op. 2
3. Sonata in B Minor, for recorder, transverse flute and continuo
6. Concerto D'echi, for two recorders and continuo
Sonata in F minor, op. 3, no. 1, for recorder and continuo
Concerto in D minor, op. 4, for recorder, strings and continuo
Sonata (Concerto) in G minor, op. 4, no. 2, for recorder, transverse flute, and viola
Trio Sonata in F major, op. 5, no. 1, for alto recorder, oboe (or violin), and continuo
Trio Sonata in C minor ("La Burrasca"), op. 5, no. 2, for recorder, violin, and continuo
Trio Sonata in G minor, op. 5, no. 3, for alto recorder, bass recorder, and continuo
Trio Sonata in G major, op. 5, no. 4, for transverse flute, obligato violoncello, and continuo
Sonata and Ciacona, op. 8, for three alto recorders
Two Trio Sonatas, op. 10, for recorder, viola, and continuo
1.
2. E-flat major
Ciacona, op. 9, for harpsichord
Ciacona, op. 11, for flute and violin
Madrigale, for solo violin
Minuet in G major ("Il Gambio"), for alto recorder, oboe, and continuo

Sources

External links

1948 births
20th-century classical composers
21st-century classical composers
German classical composers
Living people
German male classical composers
Musical hoaxes
20th-century German composers
21st-century German composers
20th-century German male musicians
21st-century German male musicians